The Javaés River ( or Braço Menor do Rio Araguaia, Javaé: ♂ Bero Biòwa [beˈɾo bɪɔˈwa], ♀ Bèraku Bikòwa [bɛɾaˈku bɪkɔˈwa]) is a river of Tocantins state in central Brazil. It is a tributary of the Araguaia River.

The Javaés River separates the Cantão State Park to the north from the Araguaia National Park to the south.

See also
List of rivers of Tocantins

References

Rivers of Tocantins